Tidaholms Bruk (the Tidaholm works) was founded in the Middle Ages and over the years it merged with several smaller industries into woodworking and the making of carts. In the small community of Sandhem outside Tidaholm the brothers Gottfrid and David Lindström in 1895 had a workshop where they made Kronan bicycles. After a while Gottried got tired of making bicycles and went to USA to study the budding automobile industry and returned full of new ideas. He was a workaholic and he worked late into the nights to create the Tidaholmsbilen (the Tidaholm car). Most of the parts were made within the works. Engine blocks and pistons in the foundry, the frame in the smithy, transmission in the mechanical workshop, woodwork in the wood workshop. In 1903 it was time for the first start attempt which was successful and the first Tidaholm car could roll out of the workshop under its own power.

Early vehicles 
The first model was called Tor I and was powered by a two-cylinder engine producing about 10 hp at 800 rpm. It could cary 1.5 tons and had a curb weight of 2.7 tons. It was sold to Surte Glasbruk and was used to transport peat. The high reliability of the car inspired the managing director Victor Johansson to put Lindström in charge of building Tor II which was finished in 1905. Tor II had three gears forward and one reverse. It was used for demonstrations at the country fair in Skara in 1905. By 1907–1910 the manufacturing had come so far that the works built a small series of ten chassis of type TB, a combined truck and personnel car, or open bus powered by a four-cylinder engine giving about 12 hp. Four personnel cars were built in 1911 or 1912 the first probably using an imported German body. The second was a test car for a possible larger production. When Tidaholms Bruk folded in 1934 the car was sold to a blacksmith and its fate is unknown. The third car was exported to Russia and delivered to a Grand Duke in St Petersburg. The Thulin logo in the front was written in Cyrillic letters on that car. The fourth car was sold to firefighters in Uppsala.

Later vehicles 
Tidaholms Bruk also sold German Fafnir cars and Argus and Deutz engines. It's very possible both engines and body from German cars was used on Tidaholm cars. A car made for Stockholms Södra Spårvägar AB had a Bugatti engine. From 1923 onwards all parts were made using a tolerance system making all parts interchangeable and standardised. They also had a testing department that tested the parts before they were assembled. In the 1920s buses became very popular and the works built special bus chassis. The engines were often four cylinder engines giving something like 40-50 hp. Starting in 1928 they worked in two shifts to be able to meet demand. In 1929 they introduced hydraulic four wheel brakes. In 1930 engineer Allan Lindström designed the first three axis bus chassis with both rear axles driven and three differentials. This was important for buses as it meant larger passenger space and softer running. The design also allowed a lower tire pressure. The first heavy truck with sleeping cabin was made in 1930. In 1931 they also made road trains for passenger transport where the bus held 37 passengers and the trailer 23. They were used by SJ in Bohuslän.

Closure 
Tidaholms Bruk made well built engines and they sold well, but experiments and new designs cost a lot of money and with the depression following the Kreuger crash the company was forced to close.

See also 
 Hesselman engine

References 

Defunct motor vehicle manufacturers of Sweden